Wanbao Mining is a Chinese mining company engaged in exploration and production of mineral resources as well as the processing and smelting of mineral ores.  The geographically diverse company operates in the Democratic Republic of Congo, Gabon, and Myanmar.

Myanmar
The company is active in Myanmar, most notably developing a copper mine at the base of the Letpadaung mountain.  Land acquisition has been a contentious matter in the expansion of the mine with protests by villagers following a proposed buyout of land encompassing 26 villages.  Wanbao made an initial offer of $600 per acre in addition to relocation to new housing, a proposal that was accepted by many in the villages but refused by holdouts who saw the compensation as inadequate for the low price and loss of livelihood.  There were intermittent protests by hundreds of villagers against the project starting in the summer of 2012 with tense police confrontations leading to the arrest of dozens of protesters.  These village protests were effective in bringing a stop to development of the mine in November of the same year.

After the halt of mine construction, the company shifted tactics and worked with Aung San Suu Kyi, the celebrated leader of the National League for Democracy and opposition politician, to win local support for the mine.  This shift from having previously negotiated with the military leadership for support of the mine to community based public relations was the focus of a Wall Street Journal article which included an interview with the company president Chen Defang.  The image building campaign documented by the Journal quoted Chen Defang as humbled by admitting error in previously ignoring community opinion and described a multi-day tour by Chen Defang with Aung San Suu Kyi to discuss with affected villagers concerns over the project.  The company president made pledges about building a library and other civic infrastructure, creating local jobs, supporting local small businesses and raising the amount of compensation for land from $600 per acre to $700–1200 per acre, depending on the use of the land.  In March 2013, the project gained crucial support when a panel led by Aung San Suu Kyi recommended mining construction resume due to the importance of the mine to the economy.

Democratic Republic of Congo
In the Democratic Republic of Congo, Wanbao holds a stake through its Wanbao Resources subsidiary in Feza Mining, which founded in 1997 is one of the longest established Chinese industrial installations in the DRC.  Feza Mining is a partnership between Wanbao and COMIDE, which itself is a joint venture between CICO and Gécamines.  Shareholders in Feza Mining include many in the DRC political leadership and Israel-based DGI International Ltd, an investment holding vehicle of Dan Gertler, an Israeli billionaire with numerous DRC and African based mining investments.  Feza Mining's assets include a Likasi, Katanga-located smelting foundry and a polymetallurgical plant opened in 2005 at Shituru.  The southern African branch of the Open Society examined the operations of Feza Mining and found the company to have longevity as an investor in staying the course while many other smelters left during the 2008 financial crisis, but on the other hand ridiculed the company for very shabby furniture and offices.

References

Chinese companies established in 2005
Copper mining companies of China
Copper mines in Myanmar
Non-renewable resource companies established in 2005
2005 establishments in China